Toye is a surname. Notable people with the surname include:

Alfred Toye (1897–1955), British World War I veteran
Christy Toye (born 1983), Irish sportsperson
Clive Toye (born 1932), British-American sports journalist
Francis Toye (1883–1964), English music critic, teacher, writer and educational administrator
Frederick E.O. Toye (born 1967), American television director and producer
Geoffrey Toye (1889–1942), British conductor, composer and opera producer
Joe Toye (1919-1995), American World War II veteran prominently featured in the book and TV miniseries Band of Brothers
John Toye (c. 1936–1992), British presenter and newsreader
John Toye (economist) (1942-2021), British economist
Lori Toye, American New Age author
Mason Toye (born 1998), American soccer player 
Patrice Toye (born 1967), Belgian film director
Richard Toye (born 1973), British historian
Robert Toye, American bank robber
Wendy Toye (1917–2010), British dancer, stage and film director and actress
William J. Toye (1931–2018), American art forger

See also
Toye, Kenning & Spencer